Basic Theology (1986, 1999) is a Systematic Theology book written by Christian author Charles Caldwell Ryrie and published by Moody Publishers.  Written for the layman, the book makes a conscious effort to use simple language and examples, many illustrations, and few footnotes. 

Basic Theology is written from a theologically conservative perspective.  It assumes a number of presuppositions, including the inerrancy of Scripture, a normal/plain interpretation of scripture, and the legitimacy of proof texts.  Ryrie's theology stems from an approach to Scripture, claiming that "when objective authority is supplemented, compromised, or abandoned, theism will be weakened or even relinquished."

See also 
 Charles Caldwell Ryrie
 Systematic Theology

scope and importance of Christian doctrine

References 

1986 books
Moody Publishers books